Daguquan Township is an rural township in Sangzhi County, Zhangjiajie, Hunan Province, China.

Administrative division
The township is divided into 13 villages, the following areas: Tulanxi Village, Wangjiawan Village, Ganta Village, Jinjiapo Village, Xuehudong Village, Xiaofutou Village, Daguquan Village, Chenjiayuan Village, Huangjiawan Village, Liaojiayuan Village, Yushuping Village, Ercengjie Village, and Shuitianping Village (土兰溪村、王家湾村、赶塔村、金家坡村、穴虎洞村、小阜头村、打鼓泉村、陈家院村、黄家湾村、廖家院村、榆树坪村、二层界村、水田坪村).

References

External links

Former towns and townships of Sangzhi County